The unicolored thrush (Turdus haplochrous) is a species of bird in the family Turdidae. It is endemic to Bolivia.

Its natural habitat is subtropical or tropical moist lowland forests.

References

unicolored thrush
Birds of Bolivia
Endemic birds of Bolivia
unicolored thrush
unicolored thrush
Taxonomy articles created by Polbot